was a scholar of Kokugaku, and was the successor to Motoori Norinaga's school master. His pen name was Fuji no Kakitsu (藤 垣内).

Life 
Ōhira was born in Matsuzaka of the province of Ise (now Matsuzaka City in Mie Prefecture). He was a son of Inagake Munetaka (稲懸 棟隆 or 稲掛 棟隆) who was a merchant and Norinaga's pupil. Ōhira entered Norinaga's School by 13 years old, and became Norinaga's adopted son at the age of 44 years. Motoori Norinaga was serving Wakayama Domain. However, Ōhira inherited a patrimony at Motoori house after the Norinaga's death, because Norinaga's first son, Motoori Haruniwa (本居 春庭) was blinded. In 1802, Wakayama Domain gave an order to Ōhira to work. After Ōhira was moved to Wakayama in 1809, Norinaga's school branched off Haruniwa's school in Matsuzaka and Ōhira's one in Wakayama.

Ōhira's character was gentle, his seigneur was deeply trusted in him. Ōhira taught seigneur about classical Japanese literature and edited "Ise Zoku Fudoki (伊勢続風土記)" that was chorography. He endeavored to succeed to Norinaga's Study and to lead the school. He had at least 1,000 pupils.

Works 

Ōhira mostly faithfully followed Norinaga's thoughts.

 Kogaku no Kaname : Japanese name (古学要)
 Tamahoko Hyakushukai : Japanese name (玉鉾百首解)
 Kagurauta Shinshaku : Japanese name (神楽歌新釈)
 Yasoura no Tama : Japanese name (八十浦之玉)
 Inabashū : Japanese name (稲葉集) It is an anthology of Waka Poems

References 

Kokugaku scholars
People from Mie Prefecture
People from Wakayama Prefecture
1756 births
1833 deaths
Japanese writers of the Edo period